The Malmö tramway network was a tram network that existed as a public transit system in Malmö, Sweden in some extent from 1887 until 1973.

History 
The tramway operated between 1887 and 1973. It started service as a horsecar. The horsecars were replaced by electric trams starting in December 1906, with the last horses being retired in February 1907. With the introduction of right-hand traffic in 1967 most tram lines were withdrawn and replaced by buses, although line 4 to Sibbarp remained until April 27 1973.

Lines

Rolling stock 

The service primarily used two-axle cars. From 1946 Type 'G' bogie cars manufactured by GM and ASEA were introduced on line 4 and from 1951-2, new two-axle cars were provided for the other remaining routes.

Proposed reintroduction 
Building a new tram network in Malmö has been proposed several times, with the municipal board beginning planning work in 2009. However, conflicting views between the municipal and regional government resulting in the planned funding from both regional and national authorities not being available resulted in these plans being shelved, with plans for busways to replace and supplement the planned tramways. Currently five busways are planned under the Malmöexpressen BRT concept, with two already opened as of February 2023.

Museum line 
For the 100-year anniversary of public transit in Malmö a new heritage line was constructed in 1987, along with an old tram being refurbished for use on the line. The 2km long line begins at the technical museum, with termini at the city library and Malmöhus Castle. The heritage line began operating in August 1987, with services operating during summer weekends starting in 1988.

Further reading

References

External links 

 Tram Malmö (in Swedish)

Rail transport in Malmö
Tram transport in Sweden
Light rail in Sweden
1887 establishments in Sweden
1887 in rail transport
Tourist attractions in Malmö
Malmö
Malmö